= O. Ö. Energiesparverband =

Energy agency of Upper Austria

The OÖ Energiesparverband is the energy agency of Upper Austria. It was set up by the regional government in 1991 to promote energy efficiency, renewable energy sources and innovative energy technologies located in Linz/Austria. Main target groups are private households, public bodies (e.g. municipalities) and businesses. The energy agency in active on local, national, EU and international levels with numerous projects and programmes.

The OÖ Energiesparverband supports the market development of sustainable energy production and use with the following programmes and projects:

- Energy information and public awareness
- Energy advice and auditing for households, public bodies and businesses
- Sustainable buildings programmes
- Training
- Management of the green energy business network Oekoenergie-Cluster
- Regional R&D programme
- Energy Performance Contracting Programme
- Local energy strategies
- European projects, international cooperation
